Bilal Brahimi (born 28 March 2000) is a French professional footballer who plays as an attacking midfielder for Ligue 2 club Caen.

Career 
Brahimi began his career at his local club of FC Villepinte. He played there from the ages of 6 to 15. Then, he went on to play for FC Montfermeil for one season. Brahimi continued his career at Troyes, where he would go on to play 36 matches and score 8 goals for the reserve side. In 2020, he signed for Le Havre; at the club, he made 3 appearances for the reserve team.

In 2021, Brahimi signed for Ligue 2 club Dunkerque. He made his professional debut for the club in a 1–1 draw against Quevilly-Rouen on 24 July 2021.

On 27 June 2022, Brahimi signed a four-year contract with Caen.

Personal life 
Born in France, Brahimi is of Moroccan descent.

Honours 
Troyes U19

 Coupe Gambardella: 2017–18

References

External links 
 USL Dunkerque profile

2000 births
Living people
People from Villepinte, Seine-Saint-Denis
French footballers
French sportspeople of Moroccan descent
Association football midfielders
ES Troyes AC players
Le Havre AC players
USL Dunkerque players
Stade Malherbe Caen players
Championnat National 3 players
Ligue 2 players
Footballers from Seine-Saint-Denis